{| class="infobox" style="font-size: 88%; width: 22em; text-align: center"
! colspan=3 style="font-size: 125%; background-color:#0055A2; color:white; text-align:center;"|
Active departments ofPersib Bandung
|- style="text-align: center"
|Football (Men's)|Football (Women's)|Football U-20 (Men's)
|- style="font-size: 90%; text-align: center"
|Football U-18 (Men's)
|Football U-16 (Men's)
|}

Persib Putri (English: Persib Women''), (also known as Persib Putri Bandung), is an Indonesian professional women's football club based in Bandung, West Java, Indonesia. Founded in 2019, the club is affiliated with men's professional association football club Persib Bandung. It currently plays in the Liga 1 Putri, the top women's league in Indonesia.

History
In July 2019, Persib announced their commitment to take part in the inaugural season of Liga 1 Putri, a women's football competition in Indonesia and formed a women's football team.

Players

Current squad

References

External links
 

Putri
 Association football clubs established in 2019
Sport in West Java
Women's football clubs in Indonesia
2019 establishments in Indonesia